Gerri de la Sal is a village and administrative center of the municipality of Baix Pallars, in Province of Lleida province, Catalonia, Spain. As of 2020, it has a population of 117.

Geography 
Gerri de la Sal is located 119km north-northeast of Lleida.

References

Populated places in the Province of Lleida